"The Nutcracker and the Mouse King" is a story written in 1816 by Prussian author E. T. A. Hoffmann, in which young Marie Stahlbaum's favorite Christmas toy, the Nutcracker, comes alive and, after defeating the evil Mouse King in battle, whisks her away to a magical kingdom populated by dolls. The story was originally published in Berlin in German as part of the collection Kinder-Mährchen, Children's Stories, by In der Realschulbuchhandlung. In 1892, the Russian composer Pyotr Ilyich Tchaikovsky and choreographers Marius Petipa and Lev Ivanov turned Alexandre Dumas' adaptation of the story into the ballet The Nutcracker.

Summary
The story begins on Christmas Eve, at the Stahlbaum house. Marie, seven, and her brother, Fritz, sit outside the parlour speculating about what kind of present their godfather, Drosselmeyer, a clockmaker and inventor, has made for them. They receive splendid gifts; Drosselmeyer's turns out to be a clockwork castle with mechanical people moving around inside. However, the children quickly tire of it. Marie notices a nutcracker, and asks whom he belongs to. Her father tells her that he belongs to all of them, but that since she is so fond of him she will be his special caretaker. She, Fritz, and their sister, Louise, pass him amongst themselves, cracking nuts, until Fritz tries to crack one that is too big and hard, and his jaw breaks. Marie, upset, bandages him with a ribbon from her dress.

When it is time for bed, the children put their Christmas gifts away in the special cabinet where they keep their toys. Marie begs to stay with the nutcracker a while longer, and she is allowed. She tells him that Drosselmeyer will fix his jaw. At this, his face seems to come alive, and Marie is frightened, but decides it was her imagination.

The grandfather clock begins to chime, and Marie believes she sees Drosselmeyer sitting on top of it, preventing it from striking. Mice begin to come out from beneath the floorboards, including the seven-headed Mouse King. The dolls in the toy cabinet come alive, the nutcracker taking command and leading them into battle after putting Marie's ribbon on. The dolls are overwhelmed by the mice. Marie, seeing the nutcracker about to be taken prisoner, throws her slipper at the Mouse King. She then faints into the toy cabinet's glass door, cutting her arm badly.

Marie wakes up in her bed the next morning with her arm bandaged and tries to tell her parents about the battle between the mice and dolls, but they do not believe her. Several days later, Drosselmeyer arrives with the nutcracker, whose jaw has been fixed, and tells Marie the story of Princess Pirlipat and Madam Mouserinks, known as the Queen of the Mice, which explains how nutcrackers came to be and why they look the way they do.

The Mouse Queen tricked Pirlipat's mother into allowing her and her children to gobble up the lard that was supposed to go into the sausage that the King was to eat at dinner. The King, enraged at the Mouse Queen for spoiling his supper and upsetting his wife, had his court inventor, also named Drosselmeyer, create traps for the Mouse Queen and her children. 

The Mouse Queen, angered at the death of her children, swore that she would take revenge on Pirlipat. Pirlipat's mother surrounded her with cats which were supposed to be kept awake by being constantly stroked. The nurses who did so fell asleep, however, and the Mouse Queen magically turned Pirlipat ugly, giving her a huge head, a wide grinning mouth, and a cottony beard like a nutcracker. The King blamed Drosselmeyer and gave him four weeks to find a cure. He went to his friend, the court astrologer. 

They read Pirlipat's horoscope and told the King the only way to cure her was to have her eat the nut Crackatook (Krakatuk), which must be cracked and handed to her by a man who had never been shaved nor worn boots since birth, and who must, without opening his eyes, hand her the kernel and take seven steps backwards without stumbling. The King sent Drosselmeyer and the astrologer out to look for both. 

The two men journeyed for many years without finding either the nut or the man, until finally they returned home to Nuremberg and found the nut with Drosselmeyer's cousin, a puppet-maker. His son turned out to be the young man needed to crack the nut Crackatook. The King promised Pirlipat's hand to whoever could crack the nut. Many men broke their teeth on it before Drosselmeyer's nephew cracked it easily and handed it to Pirlipat, who swallowed it and immediately became beautiful again. But Drosselmeyer's nephew, on his seventh backward step, stepped on the Mouse Queen and stumbled, and the curse fell on him, giving him a large head, wide mouth, and cottony beard; making him a nutcracker. The ungrateful and unsympathetic Pirlipat, seeing how ugly he had become, refused to marry him and banished him from the castle.

Marie, while she recuperates from her wound, hears the Mouse King, son of the deceased Madam Mouserinks, whispering to her in the middle of the night, threatening to bite the nutcracker to pieces unless she gives him her sweets and dolls. She sacrifices them, but he wants more and more. Finally, the nutcracker tells her that if she gets him a sword, he will kill the Mouse King. Fritz gives her the one from his toy hussars. The next night, the nutcracker comes into Marie's room bearing the Mouse King's seven crowns, and takes her to the doll kingdom, where she sees wonderful things. She falls asleep in the nutcracker's palace and is brought home. She tries to tell her mother what happened, but again she is not believed, even when she shows her parents the seven crowns, and is forbidden to speak of her "dreams" anymore. 

Marie sits in front of the toy cabinet one day while Drosselmeyer is repairing one of her father's clocks. She swears to the Nutcracker that if he were ever really real she would never behave as Pirlipat did, and would love him whatever he looked like. At this, there is a bang and she faints and falls off the chair. Her mother comes in to tell her that Drosselmeyer's nephew has arrived from Nuremberg. He tells her that by swearing that she would love him in spite of his looks, she broke the curse and made him human again. He asks her to marry him. She accepts, and in a year and a day he comes for her and takes her away to the doll kingdom, where she is crowned queen.

Publication history
The story was first published in 1816 in German in Berlin by In der Realschulbuchhandlung in a volume entitled Kinder-Mährchen, Children’s Stories, which also included tales by Carl Wilhelm Contessa and Friedrich de la Motte Fouqué. The story was republished in the first volume of Hoffmann’s short story collection, Die Serapionsbrüder, The Serapion Brethren, (1819-20). The Serapion Brethren was the name of a literary club that Hoffmann formed in 1818.

The short story was published in 1853 in the U.S. in a translation by Mrs. St. Simon in New York by D. Appleton and Company with illustrations by Albert H. Jocelyn.

In 1930, a new edition of "The Nutcracker and the Mouse-King" was published by Albert Whitman and Company in Chicago in a translation by Louise F. Encking with illustrations by Emma L. Brock.

Adaptations
 Composer Carl Reinecke created eight pieces based on the story as early as 1855. The pieces would be performed with narration telling a short adaptation of the story.
 The Nutcracker (Histoire d'un casse-noisette, 1844) is a retelling by Alexandre Dumas, père of the Hoffmann tale, nearly identical in plot. This was the version used as the basis for the 1892 Tchaikovsky ballet The Nutcracker, but Marie's name is usually changed to Clara in most subsequent adaptations.
 The story was issued as a storybook and tape in the Once Upon a Time fairy tale series.
 The Enchanted Nutcracker (1961) is a made-for-TV adaptation of the tale, written in the style of a Broadway musical, starring Robert Goulet and Carol Lawrence. It was shown once as a Christmas special, and never repeated.
 The Nutcracker is a Polish 1967 film directed by Halina Bielińska.
 It was also adapted into the 1979 stop motion film Nutcracker Fantasy, the traditional animation films Schelkunchik (Russia, 1973), and The Nutcracker Prince (Canada, 1990) and the 2010 film The Nutcracker in 3D.
 In 1988, Care Bears Nutcracker Suite is based on the story.
 The story was adapted for BBC Radio in four weekly 30-minute episodes by Brian Sibley, with original music by David Hewson and broadcast 9 December to 30 December 1991 on BBC Radio 5, later re-broadcast 27 December to 30 December 2010 on BBC Radio 7. The cast included Tony Robinson as "The Nutcracker", Edward de Souza as "Drosselmeyer", Eric Allen as "The Mouse King", James Grout as "The King" and Angela Shafto as "Mary".
 The Nutcracker Prince is a Canadian 1990 animated film directed by Paul Schibli, with Kiefer Sutherland as the Nutcracker/Hans, Megan Follows as Clara, Mike MacDonald as Mouse King, Peter O'Toole as old soldier Pantaloon, an old soldier and Phyllis Diller as Mouse Queen.
 In Mickey Mouse Works, the Mickey Mouse Nutcracker (1999) is an adaptation of this tale, with Minnie Mouse playing Marie, Mickey playing the Nutcracker, Ludwig Von Drake playing Drosselmeyer, albeit very briefly, and Donald Duck playing the Mouse King.
 In 2001, a direct-to-DVD CGI-animated movie, Barbie in the Nutcracker, was made by Mattel Entertainment starring Barbie in her first-ever movie and features the voices of Kelly Sheridan as Barbie/Clara/Sugarplum Princess and Kirby Morrow as the Nutcracker/Prince Eric.
There is a German animated direct-to-video version of the story, The Nutcracker and the Mouse King, released in 2004, which was dubbed into English by Anchor Bay Entertainment, with Leslie Nielsen as The Mouse King and Eric Idle as Drosselmeyer. It uses only a small portion of Tchaikovsky's music and adapts the Hoffmann story very loosely. The English version was the last project of veteran voice actor, Tony Pope, before his death in 2004.
 Tom and Jerry: A Nutcracker Tale is a 2007 holiday themed animated direct-to-video film produced by Warner Bros. Animation.
 In 2010, The Nutcracker in 3D – a live-action film, based only loosely on the original story – was released.
 In 2012, Big Fish Games published a computer game Christmas Stories: The Nutcracker inspired by the story.
 The Nutcracker (2013) is New Line's live-action version of the story reimagined as a drama with action and a love story. It was meant to be directed by Adam Shankman and written by Darren Lemke. The film’s production was halted in late 2012 and as of 2022 it has yet to be made.
 On December 25, 2015, German television station ARD aired a new live-action adaptation of the story as part of the 6 auf einen Streich (Six in one Stroke) television series.
In 2016, the Hallmark Channel presented A Nutcracker Christmas film that contains a number of selected scenes of the 1892 two-act Nutcracker ballet.
 Disney's 2018 live-action film The Nutcracker and the Four Realms is a retelling of the story; it is directed by Lasse Hallström and Joe Johnston.
In 2021 and 2022, PBS broadcast The Nutcracker And The Mouse King, John Mauceri's reimagining of the story, narrated by Alan Cumming in concert with the Royal Scottish National Orchestra. Mauceri presents the entire story, from “how the young man got into the nutcracker” to where to characters are “today”, using Tchaikovsky's music to highlight a story very different from the familiar ballet scenario.

References

External links 

 
 
 Illustrated book by Peter Carl Geissler of the Bamberg State Library 
 

1816 short stories
Short stories by E. T. A. Hoffmann
Germany in fiction
Christmas short stories
German children's literature
The Nutcracker
Fiction about size change
Sentient toys in fiction
Fictional mice and rats
Animal tales
Books adapted into comics